Chris Humphries (1947–2009) was a British botanist.

Chris Humphries may also refer to:
Kris Humphries (born 1985), American basketball player 
Chris Humphreys, British actor, playwright and novelist

See also
Chris Humphrey (disambiguation)